The Tunisia women's national beach handball team, nicknamed Les Aigles de Carthage (The Eagles of Carthage or The Carthage Eagles), is the national beach handball team of Tunisia. It is governed by the Tunisian Handball Federation and takes part in international beach handball competitions.

Competitive record
 Champions   Runners-up   Third Place   Fourth Place  

Red border color indicates tournament was held on home soil.

World Championship

World Games

World Beach Games

Mediterranean Beach Games

African Beach Games

Current squad 
Safa AmeriAmeni JemmaliLeila OuerfelliSamira ArfaouiSiwar AmmarAmani SalmiManel MradHanen RomdhaneBoutheina Amiche

See also
Tunisia national beach handball team
Tunisia women's national handball team
Tunisia women's national junior handball team
Tunisia women's national youth handball team

References

External links
Official website
IHF profile

Women's national handball teams
National team
National sports teams of Tunisia
Women's national beach handball teams